Corruption in Iceland describes the prevention and occurrence of corruption in Iceland.

Extent 
According to several sources, corruption is not common on a daily basis in Iceland. However, the global financial crisis and subsequent revelations have had a negative impact on the integrity and independence of Iceland's governing institutions.

Transparency International's 2021 Corruption Perceptions Index scored Iceland at 74 on a scale from 0 ("highly corrupt") to 100 ("highly clean"). When ranked by score, Iceland ranked 13th among the 180 countries in the Index, where the country ranked first is perceived to have the most honest public sector.  For comparison, the best score was 88 (ranked 1), and the worst score was 11 (ranked 180).

According to GRECO's evaluation report 2013, the Icelandic political system was weakened by potential nepotism, close personal relationships between public officials and business and political patronage at the local level. In general, businesses do not consider corruption an obstacle for doing business in Iceland, according to World Economic Forum Global Competitiveness Report 2013-2014.

References

External links
Iceland Corruption Profile from the Business Anti-Corruption Portal

Iceland
Crime in Iceland by type
Politics of Iceland